Dayuanshuai (ta-yuan-shuai) was a Chinese military rank, usually translated as grand marshal or generalissimo.

During the early Republic of China, the rank of "grand marshal of the army and navy" (陸海軍大元帥 lù hǎijūn dàyuánshuài) was assumed by Yuan Shikai in 1913, Sun Yat-sen in 1917 and Zhang Zuolin in 1927.

The rank was replaced by the Nationalist Government with the "general special class" or "generalissimo" (特級上將 Tèjí shàngjiàng) and awarded to Chiang Kai-shek in 1935.

The rank of "grand marshal of the People's Republic of China" (中华人民共和国大元帅  Zhōnghuá rénmín gònghéguó dàyuánshuài) was proposed after the establishment of the People's Republic for Mao Zedong, but was refused by Mao.

Background

Grand Marshals historically and in China 
Generalissimo is the highest rank of several current and former nations' military rank systems, and is generally awarded to the supreme commander of a country's armed forces. For example, Joseph Stalin, who was the top leader of the Soviet Union and led the Soviet Union to its victory in the Patriotic War, was awarded the rank of "Generalissimo of the Soviet Union". In addition, the National Government of the Republic of China awarded Chiang Kai-shek the rank of "Generalissimo of the Army and Navy", Nazi Germany awarded Hermann Göring the rank of Reichsmarschall, and the United States posthumously awarded the founding President George Washington the rank of "General of the Armies of the United States" in 1976.

In the Chinese context, "Grand Marshal" and "Marshal" have appeared in ancient China. For example, "Grand Marshal of the World Soldiers and Horses" in the Liao Dynasty was an important title for the crown prince or the heir to the throne, but they were only court titles rather than military ranks. [3] After modern China, the "General Marshal" became the honorary or post title of the head of state or the supreme commander of the national armed forces, but they were not official military ranks, for example: Emperor Guangxu of the Qing Dynasty Zaiyun and Emperor Xuantong's father Jianguo regent The prince Zaifeng was appointed as the 'Marshal of the Navy and the Army'. The Northern Government of the Republic of China, such as Yuan Shikai, Li Yuanhong, Duan Qirui, and Zhang Zuolin, all served as the "Marshals of the Navy and Army." "General Marshal of the Army", Pu Yi once served as "Marshal of the Army and Navy of Manchuria" and so on. After the outbreak of the Anti-Japanese War in 1937, Chiang Kai-shek was appointed as the "Grand Marshal of the Army, Navy and Air Force of the Republic of China" and became the last General Marshal of the Republic of China. This "Grand Marshal" was also the title of the highest military commander during the war. It was a symbolic and informal title. After the founding of the People's Republic of China, the military rank system was established for the first time in 1955, and the rank of "Grand Marshal" became the PRC's highest official military rank, but it was never awarded.

The People's Liberation Army plans to implement the military rank system 
The military rank system is a military management system that indicates the military rank, social status, and honor of soldiers. The implementation of the military rank system is an important measure and symbol of the normalization and modernization of the military. The predecessor of the Chinese People's Liberation Army led by the Communist Party of China, the Chinese Workers and Peasants Red Army, the Eighth Route Army, and the New Fourth Army did not implement the military rank system. The People's Liberation Army did not implement the military rank system at first. However, before the founding of the People's Republic of China in 1939, 1946, and 1948, the Chinese Communist Party and the People's Liberation Army had deliberated on implementing the military rank system three times, but it was not implemented due to various reasons such as historical conditions during the war years. In 1955, Chairman Mao was offered the rank of Grand Marshal which he declined and ordered by principle, only cadres who are still active officers in the PLA are to be given ranks. Thus, Deng Xiaoping, Liu Shaoqi and Zhou Enlai also declined ranks.

The outbreak of the Korean War and the completion of the military rating work 
At the same time that the PLA began preparations for military ranks, the Korean War broke out and China intervened in the war, resulting in the suspension of preparations. It was also during the Korean War that the importance of the military rank system was manifested. For example, on the battlefield, the Chinese and North Korean armies fought in concert, but the Korean People's Army had military ranks, while the Chinese People's Volunteers, adapted from the People's Liberation Army, had no military ranks. The command relationship brought many inconveniences, and it also made Peng Dehuai, commander and political commissar of the Volunteer Army, feel the necessity of establishing a military rank system. Later, someone cited the example of the Panmunjom negotiations, pointing out that during the Sino-US negotiations, the US military had military ranks but the volunteers did not. For the sake of "equal equality", China could only temporarily assign "military ranks" to negotiators. The emergence of such an embarrassing situation also shows the urgency of China to establish a military rank system to facilitate international exchanges. In August 1951, Peng Dehuai sent a telegram to Mao Zedong, stating: “The requirement for job identification is necessary in the current battle.” The prerequisite for establishing military ranks is to rank officers. In October of the same year, the Central Committee The Military Commission instructed the entire army to carry out cadre rating work. In April 1952, when Peng Dehuai returned to China for treatment, the central government decided to let him stay in Beijing to preside over the daily work of the Military Commission, focusing on military reform work including the assessment of officer ranks and the establishment of a military rank system. The rating work was basically completed that year.

See also
 Generalissimus of the Soviet Union
 Taewonsu
 Dai-gensui

References 

Yuanshuai
+
Military history of the Republic of China (1912–1949)
Military ranks of the People's Republic of China